There have been eleven Gordon Baronetcies  :

Gordon of Letterfourie, Sutherland (1625) 
The creation of Robert Gordon of Gordonstoun, 4th son of the Alexander Gordon, 12th Earl of Sutherland, to the Baronetage of Nova Scotia was the first such in that Baronetage, and until the line failed in 1908 were the premier baronets in Scotland.

Gordon of Gordonstoun 
 Sir Robert Gordon, 1st Baronet (1580–1656), MP for Invernesshire
 Sir Ludovick Gordon, 2nd Baronet (1624 – ), MP for Elgin & Forresshire
 Sir Robert Gordon, 3rd Baronet FRS (1647–1704), MP for Sutherland
 Sir Robert Gordon, 4th Baronet (1696–1772), MP for Caithness 1715–1722
 Sir Robert Gordon, 5th Baronet (c. 1738 – 1776)
 Sir William Gordon, 6th Baronet (died 1795)

Gordon of Letterfourie 
 Alexander Gordon of Letterfourie (1715–1797), never assumed title, dormant until 1806
 Sir James Gordon, 8th Baronet (1779–1843)
 Sir William Gordon, 9th Baronet (1803–1861)
 Sir Robert Glendonwyn Gordon, 10th Baronet (1824–1908)
baronetcy dormant 24 Mar 1908

Gordon of Cluny, Aberdeen (1625) 
 Sir Alexander Gordon, 1st Baronet (died c. 1648)
 Sir John Gordon, 2nd Baronet (died c. 1668)
baronetcy dormant c 1668

Gordon of Lesmore, Aberdeen (1625) 

 Sir James Gordon, 1st Baronet (died c. 1640)
 Sir James Gordon, 2nd Baronet (died c. 1647)
 Sir William Gordon, 3rd Baronet (died c. 1671)
 Sir William Gordon, 4th Baronet (died c. 1684)
 Sir James Gordon, 5th Baronet (died c. 1710)
 Sir William Gordon, 6th Baronet (died 1750)
 Sir Alexander Gordon, 7th Baronet (died 1782)
 Sir Francis Gordon, 8th Baronet (c. 1764 – 1839)
baronetcy dormant 9 Nov 1839

Gordon of Lochinvar, Kirkcudbright (1626) 
 Sir Robert Gordon of Lochinvar, 1st Baronet (c 1565 – 1628)
 Sir John Gordon, 2nd Baronet (1599–1634) created Viscount of Kenmure in 1633
Baronetcy merged with Viscountcy until it became dormant in 1847

Gordon of Embo, Sutherland (1631) 
 Sir John Gordon, 1st Baronet (died 1649)
 Sir Robert Gordon, 2nd Baronet (died 1697)
 Sir John Gordon, 3rd Baronet (died 1701)
 Sir William Gordon, 4th Baronet (died 1760)
 Sir John Gordon, 5th Baronet (died 1779)
 Sir James Gordon, 6th Baronet (died 1786)
 Sir William Gordon, 7th Baronet (1736–1804)
 Sir John Gordon, 8th Baronet (died 1804)
 Sir Orford Gordon, 9th Baronet (died 1857)
 Sir William Home Gordon, 10th Baronet (1818–1876)
 Sir Home Seton Gordon, 11th Baronet (1845–1906)
 Sir Home Seton Charles Montagu Gordon, 12th Baronet (1871–1956)
Baronetcy extinct or dormant 9 Sep 1956

Gordon of Haddo, Aberdeen (1642) 
see Marquess of Aberdeen and Temair

Gordon of Park, Banff (1686) 
 Sir John Gordon, 1st Baronet (died 1713)
 Sir James Gordon, 2nd Baronet (died 1727)
 Sir William Gordon, 3rd Baronet (died 1751)
 Sir John James Gordon, 4th Baronet (1749–1780)
 Sir John Bury Gordon, 5th Baronet (1779–1835)
baronetcy extinct or dormant 23 Jul 1835

Gordon of Dalpholly, Sutherland (1704) 
also known as Gordon of Invergordon 
 Sir William Gordon, 1st Baronet (died 1742) MP for Sutherlandshire 1708–1713 and 1714–1727 and Cromartyshire 1741–1742
 Sir John Gordon, 2nd Baronet (c. 1707 – 1783) MP for Cromartyshire 1742–1747 and 1754–1761
 Sir Adam Gordon, 3rd Baronet (died 1817) Rector of West Tilbury in Essex
 Sir George Gordon, 4th Baronet (died 1840)
 Sir Adam Gordon, 5th Baronet (died 1850)baronetcy dormant 1850 Gordon of Earlston, Kirkcudbright (1706) 
 Sir William Gordon, 1st Baronet, of Earlston (1654–1718)
Sir Alexander Gordon, 2nd Baronet (1650–1726)
 Sir Thomas Gordon, 3rd Baronet (1685–1769)
 Sir John Gordon, 4th Baronet (1720–1795)
 Sir John Gordon, 5th Baronet (1780–1843)
 Sir William Gordon, 6th Baronet (1830–1906)
 Sir Charles Edward Gordon, 7th Baronet (1835–1910)
 Sir Robert Charles Gordon, 8th Baronet (1862–1939)
 Sir John Charles Gordon, 9th Baronet (1901–1982)
 Sir Robert James Gordon, 10th Baronet (born 1932)

 Gordon of Newark-upon-Trent, Nottinghamshire (1764) 
 Sir Samuel Gordon, 1st Baronet (died 1780)
 Sir Jenison William Gordon, 2nd Baronet (1747–1831)baronetcy extinct 1831 Gordon of Northcourt, Isle of Wight (1818) 
 Sir James Willoughby Gordon, 1st Baronet (1772–1851)
 Sir Henry Percy Gordon, 2nd Baronet (1806–1876)baronetcy extinct 1876References

Notes

Sources
Cokayne. Complete Baronetage''. V vols. Exeter, 1902. 

Baronetcies in the Baronetage of Nova Scotia
Dormant baronetcies in the Baronetage of Nova Scotia
Extinct baronetcies in the Baronetage of Great Britain
Extinct baronetcies in the Baronetage of the United Kingdom
1625 establishments in Nova Scotia
1764 establishments in Great Britain
1818 establishments in the United Kingdom